The 1963 Paris–Nice was the 21st edition of the Paris–Nice cycle race and was held from 10 March to 17 March 1963. The race started in Paris and finished in Nice. The race was won by Jacques Anquetil of the Saint-Raphaël team.

General classification

References

1963
1963 in road cycling
1963 in French sport
March 1963 sports events in Europe
1963 Super Prestige Pernod